At the 1998 FIFA World Cup, the 32 teams were divided into eight groups of four, labelled A–H. The four teams in Group G were England, Romania, Colombia and Tunisia. With wins in their first two games against Colombia and England, followed by a draw against Tunisia, Romania won the group and qualified for the round of 16. England and Colombia were level on points before they played each other in their final match, each having defeated Tunisia and lost to Romania. England, with a better goal difference, only required a draw to advance. They won the match to take the second qualifying place.

Standings

Romania advanced to play Croatia (runner-up of Group H) in the round of 16.
England advanced to play Argentina (winner of Group H) in the round of 16.

Matches

England vs Tunisia

Romania vs Colombia

Colombia vs Tunisia

Romania vs England

Colombia vs England

Romania vs Tunisia

Group G
England at the 1998 FIFA World Cup
Romania at the 1998 FIFA World Cup
Tunisia at the 1998 FIFA World Cup
Colombia at the 1998 FIFA World Cup